Josip Šojat (born 6 March 1948 in Senj) is a former Croatian handball player.

He was the coach of the women's national team of Croatia.

His biggest achievement is winning the Women's EHF Champions League in 1996 after losing in the final in the year before.

Honours

As player
Medveščak Zagreb
Yugoslav Cup (3): 1970, 1978, 1981

As coach
Medveščak Zagreb
Yugoslav Cup (2): 1986, 1987

Laško Pivovarna Celje
1. SRL (5): 1991-92, 1992-93, 1993-94, 2000-01
Slovenian Cup (5): 1992, 1993, 1994, 1995, 2000

Podravka Koprivnica
Croatian First A League (5): 1994-95, 1995-96, 2004-05, 2005-06, 2006-07
Croatian Cup (3): 1995, 1996, 2006
EHF Champions League (1): 1995-96
EHF Champions Trophy (1): 1996

Croatia (W)
1996 European Championship - 6th place
1997 World Championship - 6th place
1997 Mediterranean Games - 2nd place
2005 Mediterranean Games - 3rd place
2006 European Championship -  7th place
2007 World Championship - 9th place
2008 European Championship - 8th place

Individual
Croatian handball coach of the year by SN and CHF: 1996 and 2007

References

Yugoslav male handball players
Croatian male handball players
RK Zamet coaches
People from Senj
Handball players from Rijeka
1948 births
Living people
Croatian expatriate sportspeople in Slovenia
Croatian handball coaches